Philip Diehl may refer to:
 Philip Diehl (inventor) (1847–1913), German-American engineer and inventor
 Philip N. Diehl, director of the United States Mint
 Phillip Diehl, American baseball player